La Rivière-du-Nord (The Rivière-du-Nord or The River of the North) is a regional county municipality in the Laurentides region of Quebec, Canada. The seat is in Saint-Jérôme. It is named for the river that runs through it, the Rivière du Nord.

Its population according to the 2016 Canadian Census was 128,170.

Subdivisions
There are 5 subdivisions within the RCM:

Cities & Towns (3)
 Prévost
 Saint-Colomban
 Saint-Jérôme

Municipalities (2)
 Saint-Hippolyte
 Sainte-Sophie

Transportation

Access Routes
Highways and numbered routes that run through the municipality, including external routes that start or finish at the county border:

 Autoroutes
 

 Principal Highways
 
 

 Secondary Highways
 

 External Routes
 None

See also
 List of regional county municipalities and equivalent territories in Quebec

References

Regional county municipalities in Laurentides
Census divisions of Quebec
Saint-Jérôme